Captain  James Fall (pronounced Faw) (c. 1685–1743) was Scottish MP for Haddington Burghs (1734–1742).

One of four brothers who built a mercantile empire centred on Dunbar, as MP he represented the interests of the family. The family also dominated Dunbar town council, where Fall's career continued; he served as bailie (magistrate) from October 1735 until his death.

Fall residedat Dunbar (now Lauderdale) House, which he had built, at the north end of Dunbar High Street. He married Jean Murray and had a daughter, Janet, who married Sir John Anstruther. He was buried at Dunbar on 9 December 1743.

References

Dunbar Burgh Records,
National Archives of Scotland.

Year of birth missing
1743 deaths
Members of the Parliament of Great Britain for Scottish constituencies
British MPs 1734–1741
British MPs 1741–1747